Dad is the second studio album by the Christian alternative rock band Breakfast with Amy, released in 1991. Produced by the band at Casbah Studios in Fullerton, CA, Dad was the group's second studio album and first studio release with new label Blonde Vinyl Records. Breakfast with Amy's new
home with Michael Knott's record company, which was at the time at the forefront of the Christian alternative rock scene in Southern California, allowed the band access to a much larger audience than before with Narrowpath Records. This album saw the band use more punk sounds than in their previous release, although some neo-psychedelic/funk influences are still present.

Songs from the album were featured on all of Blonde Vinyl's compilation CDs except their first, Blonde Vinyl Teaser I. This album was also one of
the few during Blonde Vinyl's short lifespan to produce a music video (for the song "Me".)

Track listing
All songs written by Breakfast with Amy.
 "Me" – 3:41
 "Tell Mama" – 2:58
 "You" – 2:53
 "So It Goes" – 4:53
 "Mermelstein and the Disappearing Sink" – 4:18
 "Ad America" – 3:59
 "The Short, Happy Life of Henrietta" – 5:04
 "Your Name" – 4:29
 "You're Soaking in It" – 2:46
 "Sea Shanty of an Icelandic Midwife" – 2:23
 "Come On, Joan" – 2:45

Personnel
 David Koval — vocals, electric sitar, acoustic guitar
 Edwin Wohler — bass guitar
 Christopher Colbert — guitar
 Caryn Colbert — guitar
 Paul Pelligrin — drums
 Michael J. Pritzl — acoustic guitar
 Christopher Colbert — engineer
 Mr. Rhumba — assistant engineer
 Doug Doyle — Mastered @ Digital Brothers, Costa Mesa, CA

References

1991 albums
Breakfast with Amy albums
Blonde Vinyl Records albums